Andrej Džaković (born January 30, 1988) is a Serbian former professional basketball player.

External links
 RealGM profile

1988 births
Living people
Basketball League of Serbia players
KK Beovuk 72 players
KK FMP players
KK FMP (1991–2011) players
KK Radnički FMP players
KK Radnički KG 06 players
Montenegrin expatriate basketball people in Serbia
Montenegrin men's basketball players
Serbian men's basketball players
Shooting guards